Pam Altendorf (born November 17, 1972) is an American politician serving in the Minnesota House of Representatives since 2023. A member of the Republican Party of Minnesota, Altendorf represents District 20A in southeastern Minnesota, which includes the city of Red Wing, Lake City and Cannon Falls and parts of Dakota, Goodhue, and Wabasha Counties.

Minnesota House of Representatives 
Altendorf was elected to the Minnesota House of Representatives in 2022. She first ran after three-term Republican incumbent Barb Haley announced she would not seek reelection.

Altendorf serves on the Climate and Energy Finance and Policy, Education Finance, and Elections Finance and Policy Committees.

Electoral history

Personal life 
Altendorf lives in Red Wing, Minnesota with her husband, Kevin, and has five children. Her second cousin is Brian Pfarr, who has served in the Minnesota House since 2021.

References

External links 

 Official House of Representatives website
 Official campaign website

Republican Party members of the Minnesota House of Representatives
1972 births
Living people